KFJC (89.7 FM) is a non-commercial college radio station in Los Altos Hills, California, at Foothill College, using a variety radio format that features a broad spectrum of music styles and public affairs programming. KFJC's over-the-air broadcast is 24/7 and can be heard within the southern San Francisco Bay Area.

KFJC's mission is to be a conduit for new and interesting audio art and information. KFJC's music programming is largely oriented to recent material from many genres. Most programs must play at least 35% (by song count) tracks from material added in the last 8 weeks. The station is licensed to the trustees of the Foothill-De Anza Community College District and operated as a teaching laboratory for the Fine Arts and Communications Department of Foothill College. As a community radio station, the vast majority of KFJC's small operating budget is raised during their annual fundraiser held each October, which is supplemented by other community events such as penny-pitches, film festivals, and the like. 

KFJC's 300-watt transmitter is located on Black Mountain, in the Monte Bello Open Space Preserve, south of Los Altos, California.



History

1959–1970
KFJC signed on October 20, 1959, broadcasting from a broom closet at the old Foothill Junior College campus in Mountain View. The station broadcast from 5 p.m. until 7 p.m. Monday through Thursday, playing "study music" and pre-recorded educational materials. In 1961, Foothills Junior College and KFJC moved to their current location in Los Altos Hills; the station also moved from 88.5 to 89.7 MHz. In 1965, the first rock and roll record was played on KFJC, causing the DJ Woody Muff to be reprimanded shortly after. The next year, however, Woody was rewarded; on April 2, the first rock and roll show was allowed to run on KFJC. It did not last a year, however, before it was forced off the air by more conservative staff members. By 1968, KFJC numbered 100 staff volunteers and was broadcasting from noon to 9:30 p.m. Monday through Friday. Rock and roll was making more frequent appearances on the station. In 1970, KFJC hosted an open mike session during a nationwide student strike that had also shut down the Foothill College campus.

1971–1985
In 1974, KFJC began broadcasting in stereo after 15 years of mono FM broadcast.

In the early 1970s, KFJC was a randomly block-formatted station, playing mainly bubblegum top 40, specialty/ethnic, or progressive rock, depending on the disc-jockey. Airshifts were assigned by the program director, but the schedule was not strict i.e. the station would sign off and on depending on whether the DJ showed up. Record service consisted of a smattering of 45s sent from a few of the major record labels. In 1973 several of the progressive-rock oriented students became very involved and vowed to clean up the lax formatting.

Throughout these years KFJC was run by students who were in a 2-year broadcasting program. After 2 years in the program, the student was obliged to "move on" to make room for incoming students. Approximately 80 new students signed up for the on-air class every year during this time. The program director and music director maintained a mostly Progressive-Rock format, using a "clock" showing when on-air breaks were to be taken and what announcements were to occur during those breaks i.e. The Entertainment Calendar, PSAs, or promos for the many station benefits that the staff organized. The clock gave students the feel for what professional stations would ask them to follow.

The program director and music director collaborated to create a playlist which was sent to the record companies (just as the professional stations did). This enabled KFJC to get great album service from all of the major and minor record labels for the first time. A system of noting time and date that songs were played was put into use to avoid over-playing the same songs. The playlist that was sent to the record labels was derived from these notations. Several ethnic and specialty shows were also part of the programming during these years.

Emphasis was put on developing a good sound—good enough to take listeners away from the professional stations (mainly KOME, KSJO, and KSAN). Jocks were encouraged to play songs and groups that were being exclusively played on KFJC. According to surveys conducted by KOME, KFJC had quite a following during the 1973-1975 era.

The format clock eventually became very tight, with an ensuing restricted sound. In late 1978, five student managers decided to restore the music format to again include punk/new-wave—this time, emphasizing the genre. They voted out the General Manager, John Low. DJs were now encouraged to play "alternate" tracks from bands like the Ramones, Elvis Costello, the Knack, and the Clash, i.e., songs that weren't being played by the professional stations (KSJO, KOME, and KSAN). Influential players during this phase were General Manager Kerry Loewen, Music Director Bob Gibson, Program Director Robert "Quasimoto" Zepernick, News Director Teresa "Trash" Heinrich, Kevin "LION!" Hardiman, Todd E. Daniels, Boris Darling, Frankie Carbuncle, Bob "Bob Doll" Gaynor, Leslie "Chris Gray" Smith, Scott "Gideon Baxter" Sanderson, Kevin "Grranimal" Ariente, Ric (Sky) Curtice, Bryce "Mark Elliot" Canyon, Rabbi Fächman, Cubby Calcutta, Charles Hutchinson, Angstmaster Fast Max, Faulty Bagnose, Clive "Bongo" Fleishman, Elmo C. Esta, Anita "Know" Plep, Paul Kiely, Kelly Porter, Doc Pelzel and the Duck from Columbia.

In 1980, KFJC upgraded its transmitter from 10 to 250 watts, expanding its broadcasting range. In 1981, KFJC started the annual tradition of the "Month of Mayhem", in which the month is filled with special programming from increased live mics to in-depth coverage of artists.

At 6 p.m. on August 19, 1983, the station started playing variations of Louie Louie. The event, known as "Maximum Louie Louie", saw 823 versions of the song played over the course of 63 hours. The escapade was the result of a competition between Bay Area radio stations. It was covered by Bay Area media and featured in The Wall Street Journal.

In 1984 the KFJC studios were enlarged and received a bathroom, much to the delight of the DJs.

KFJC started to become a "major player" in the record industry, with several staffers going on to label/promo jobs. The yearly pilgrimages to the CMJ Convention in New York City started around this time, and the West Coast interlopers from "The Wave of The West" literally made their mark on the Big Apple, for example: when CBGB's closed, photos were taken for a tribute book, and over the ladies' room sink was the distinctive red, black and white triangle logo sticker, allegedly affixed there by former promotions director Tracie Jarosh ("Sarah Barhear/Nancy Sin").

In 1985, KFJC hosted the Inter-Collegiate Broadcasting System Convention at the newly refurbished St. Claire Hilton in San Jose, California. College radio students from the western portion of the United States, music industry representatives from across the States, and indie music fans from where ever the spirit moved them, converged upon the Southern Bay Area for this three-day event. Frank Zappa, due to illness, gave a memorable remote address to the attended audience during a live remote hook-up. Matt Heckert, from Survival Research Laboratories, gave a well received keynote address to a captive crowd at lunch. Afterwards, showing the intricacies of his homemade flamethrower device, Heckert inadvertently set off the newly installed fire suppression system in the hotel.

Numerous bands performed during the I.B.S. convention for the attendees. KFJC 89.7 F.M. broadcast live the Saturday Night's performances of Southern California's Saccharine Trust, the legendary Camper Van Beethoven, and the heavily industry backed 28th Day. During the performance, David Lowery, the lead singer of Camper Van, was clearly heard berating the program coordinator of the show regarding the mix-up of who the headlining act would be. He was correct in his missive, but more importantly, the performances from all three artists were impressive. On an alternate stage, the band Tex & the Horseheads put on what was said by an attendee to be an inspiringly drunken performance. During the Sunday Matinee of the convention, two other bands performed in the cozy confines of the top floor of the newly rebuilt Hotel. The Muskrats of the Berkeley folk persuasion gave a resounding performance, marred only by the uncontrolled burning of one of their musical instruments: their washboard. Quite to the contrary of expectations, the band The Circle Jerks, led by Keith Morris, resplendent in their black tuxedos, put on a wonderfully sublime performance.

The program coordinator for this successful event was Michael Davis, a recent convert to KFJC from KSCU 103.3 FM (The Santa Clara University). While he performed ably during this mission of coordinating the I.B.S. Convention, it was really Robert "Doc" Pelzel, and his well chosen crew, who did all of the heavy lifting of the task at hand.

1986–2000
Until the late 80's, the General Manager duties were handled mostly by Robert Zepernick, aka "Ransome Youth" (formerly "Quasimodo"). Jeff Cloninger won the GM election in 1984, but stepped down after accepting a job in the broadcast industry, and Zepernick took the station's helm again. He was succeeded by John Porter ("P. Boy"), and later by Music Director Doug Kelly ("Hank Stamper") from 1989 to 1991.

In 1991, "Hawkeye Joe" Scott, who had held a variety of management positions (chief announcer, news/public affairs director, promotions director and 2 one-month stints for two different GMs as program director) was elected general manager, a position he held until 1993. He had left KFJC for commercial radio several times, but by his own admission, kept returning to KFJC "because there's no other radio station in the world where I can be this nutty and have this much fun!". Scott, who had wanted to be in radio ever since he was a boy, split his duties as G.M. and as the acerbic, Alex Bennett-bashing (and sometimes bibulous) morning host of "The Lose-Your-Breakfast Club".

Scott's "loose cannon" style of management didn't necessarily sit well with all staff members, but he encouraged diversity, merriment & "happy chaos", and the listeners heard it. During that time, and into the next G.M.'s shift, KFJC was nominated for several Gavin "College Radio Station Of The Year" awards. KFJC also won a "Donahue" award from the SF Radio Coalition, and shared a Billboard "College Station of The Year" award, resulting in its first-ever live broadcast from the East Coast. KFJC also resumed live remote broadcasts from all sorts of locations, kicking off with a "Battle Of The Morning DJs". This consisted of an entire month of Don Harrison ("Mark Darms") and "Hawkeye Joe" trading off their respective Monday/Tuesday 6–10 am slots ('LYB Club' vs. 'Relish it!'). The re-inauguration of station live remotes was from the parking lot of a local underwriter, Olivari Donuts in Mountain View. Eventually, Scott's other duties as "Sunday Funnies" producer at KNEW, and promotions intern at KSAN, and other aspects of his personal life resulted in the end of his "reign of terror", as he later jokingly called it.

In 1993, a new administration took over, under the leadership of Steve Taiclet (general manager from 1993 to 1996 and 2000 to 2004), and a series of major changes began. Annual on-air fund raisers were initiated in order to underwrite KFJC's basic needs and, more importantly, to fund many much needed technological improvements. As part of these annual on-air fund raisers, the "Penny Pitch" was born. During the "Penny Pitch," KFJC staff go out into the community with live broadcasts and ask for spare pocket change. This is a chance to meet the faces behind the microphones and occasionally hear live bands. 1994 brought the first KFJC CD release, "Summer Surf." This was the first in a long line of CDs created at KFJC issued during the annual fund-raiser. 
As a result of the technological improvements made possible by successful fund raisers, in 1996 KFJC went international, with live broadcasts from Brixton, England of live sets from Ascension, the Bevis Frond, Ramleh and the Shadow Ring over two weekends. In that year, KFJC also began streaming over the Internet. The 'lower' production studio was remodeled over the summer of 1996, with a custom-made desk replacing the original card table. KFJC's next international broadcasts occurred in 2000, when the staff went to Dunedin, New Zealand, for 6 nightly broadcasts of the "Dunedin Sound" showcase at the Otago Festival Of The Arts. These broadcasts featured performances by such legendary underground groups as the Clean, the Chills, the Dead C., Alastair Galbraith, the Renderers, Snapper, and the Verlaines. The following year, a double CD documenting these broadcasts was produced for the Station's annual fund raiser.

2001–present
As a result of continuing successful fund raisers, in 2002 and 2003 KFJC studios were upgraded again, bringing new equipment introducing digital broadcast mixers as well as a 24-track digital portable multitrack recording system. In 2004 KFJC celebrated 45 years on the air with an entire day of 45s being played on October 31. KFJC no longer focuses its efforts as being a training ground for students wishing to enter the broadcasting industry. Each show continues to have its own personality as determined by the DJ (with approval from the program director). DJs follow a moderately strict break clock and all shows (with the exception of certain "specialty shows") must play a minimum of 35% of their content from recently added material—known as the "current library". The exceptions to this policy are during "live mics" when bands play live at the station in an area affectionately known as "the pit", the occasional "Freak Week" of freeform programming, and the "Month of Mayhem" (May) when DJs are encouraged to come up with original programming focused on a band, a genre or another creative theme. KFJC celebrated its 50th anniversary in 2009 hosting a number of events throughout the year. The station held a logo contest and featured the winner and runners up in a San Jose art gallery exhibition called Blowing Minds Since 1959. Former KFJC DJs also joined in to help celebrate their 50th anniversary as part of a DJs from the past series, featuring memorable past DJs such as Hairy Kari, Jack Soil, Reject Girl, Peggy O, JC Clone, Diana Goddess of Pop, and Daryl Licht.  There were tentative plans to move the station to other facilities on the Foothill campus between 2012 and 2014. However, Foothill College placed relocation of KFJC on very low priority in relation to other academic facilities, possibly because of recent educational budget cuts in California and other economic woes.

From volunteers to professional careers 
The great enthusiasm generated by being part of KFJC successfully spawned a number of professionals directly from its airwaves. Jona Denz was hired as a disc jockey on KOME while still holding the KFJC Station Manager position. Wendy Hoag also joined KOME. Mike Danberger joined KARA. Chris Holt went straight to KEZR's engineering department. Former KFJC Station Manager Wade Axell went directly to KGO as a producer then bought his own station. Program Director Terry Gillingham was hired as an announcer on KEZR and eventually bought his own station. Another P.D., Gary Lee Fazekas, took a job at KFMR and was joined by yet another P.D., Ken Mensing. Steve Urbani, Steve Burrell, Tom Evans, and Judy Wasson started a station in San Luis Obispo. Kathy Roddy and Karl Jay Hess became popular at KFAT. Tom Creed (Jack Flash) went on to KXRX. Ted Brooks took a job as a studio producer. Mike Martin became KSAN's librarian. Joe Eick took a job at KFRC. Public affairs director John Kotter was hired by KLOK and KBAY to become production and program manager. Rock Dibble joined Capitol Records. Peter Napoli was hired by a radio station in Santa Monica as music director. Tony Mercurio was hired at a station out of town. Todd E Daniels was hired to work in the production department at KXRX. Hawkeye Joe Scott went to KXRX, KLIV then KLRB-Monterey, "Alice", and still works in radio. Ric Curtice went to KOME as an on-air personality and then on to MCA Records. Kevin Ariente got a job at KXRX as board op/talk show producer. Janie Freeman got a job at KPEN. Sandy Althaus became (and still is) an on-air personality at KQED-FM. Kerry Loewen was hired by KSJO as host of the "Modern Humans". Loewen was succeeded by Teresa "Trash" Heinrich at KSJO. Quarter after quarter, radio stations hired members of KFJC to paying jobs. Bryce Canyon went on to work on "Early Tremors" with Belle Nolan and Frank Andrick on San Francisco's new wave station "The Quake" and wrote numerous articles for several Bay area publications.

Jennifer Waits
Jennifer Waits, publicity director, and weekly show host, since 1999, was graduated from Haverford College in 1989, and received a Master’s degree in Popular Culture Studies from Bowling Green State University in 1997. Waits has written for Radio World, PopMatters, Radio Journal, and Sassy. Waits has visited and profiled over 150 radio stations all around the United States (14 states, 69 college stations, 19 community stations) and Ireland (3), documented in over 100 field reports at radiosurvivor.com, starting in 2008. Waits co-chairs the College, Community and Educational Radio Caucus on the Library of Congress’ Radio Preservation Task Force.

Fundraising
KFJC is listener-sponsored and holds an annual fundraiser each October. They feature an annual CD, specialty T-shirts (which have featured designs by numerous famous underground artists such as Kozik, Robert Williams, and the Pizz, among others), hoodies, girlie shirts and other paraphernalia.

References

External links

Maximum Louie Louie - Information on Maximum Louie Louie
David Plotnikoff, SJ Mercury News KFJC circa 1990

Freeform radio stations
FJC
Radio stations established in 1959
FJC
Mass media in San Jose, California